"Holla at Your Boy" is a song by Nigerian singer Wizkid. It was officially released on 2nd January 2010, as the lead single from his debut studio album Superstar (2011). The song was produced by DJ Klem (Knighthouse) and Vebee.

Background
"Holla at Your Boy" earned Wizkid the Next Rated award at The Headies 2011. The song is a cover of the song "Girls" by Korean singer named Se7en, which featured female rapper Lil Kim In addition to winning the award, he was awarded a 2012 Hyundai Sonata courtesy of the organizers. The car's presentation ceremony took place at the Silverbird Galleria in Victoria Island, Lagos. Guy Murray Bruce, Bola Salako and Ayo Animashaun were present during the ceremony. Wizkid joined the list of past winners, including Aṣa, Overdose, Omawumi, Wande Coal and Skuki.

Music video
The music video for "Holla at Your Boy" was directed by Patrick Ellis. It was shot at Dowen College in Lekki, Lagos, and features cameo appearances from Banky W, Skales and Ice Prince.

Accolades
The song earned Wizkid the Next Rated award at The Headies 2011. The music video for "Holla at Your Boy" was nominated for Most Gifted Newcomer Video at the 2011 Channel O Music Video Awards. The video was also nominated for Best Afro Pop Video at the 2011 Nigeria Music Video Awards (NMVA).

References

2010 songs
2010 singles
Wizkid songs
Songs written by Wizkid